The 2010 French Indoor Athletics Championships was the 39th edition of the national championship in indoor track and field for France, organised by the French Athletics Federation. It was held on 27–28 February at the Palais Omnisports de Paris-Bercy in Paris. A total of 26 events (divided evenly between the sexes) were contested over the two-day competition.

Three national indoor records were set at the competition. Leslie Djhone broke the French record in the men's 400 metres with a time of 45.85 seconds, Larbi Bourrada set an Algerian record of 5911 points for the men's indoor heptathlon, and Binta Diagana set a Mauritanian record of 14.89 m in the women's shot put.

Results

Men

Women

References

Results
 
 
Results. French Athletics Federation. Retrieved 2021-04-06.

External links
French Athletics Federation website

French Indoor Athletics Championships
French Indoor Athletics Championships
French Indoor Athletics Championships
French Indoor Athletics Championships
French Indoor Athletics Championships
Sports competitions in Paris
Athletics in Paris